Chornohuzy is a village located in Vyzhnytsia Raion, Chernivtsi Oblast, Ukraine. It belongs to Vyzhnytsia urban hromada, one of the hromadas of Ukraine.

References 

Villages in Vyzhnytsia Raion